Holme Hall near Bakewell, Derbyshire, is a  privately owned 17th-century country house. It is a Grade I listed building.

History
The house was built, on the site of a previous manor house, in 1627 for Barnard Wells of Stoke Hall (Derbyshire), gentleman.  His daughter Mary married Henry Bradshaw, brother of regicide John Bradshaw. Another daughter and coheiress married Robert Eyre and inherited Holme in 1658.

The original entrance front to the south has three storeys and three bays, the central one projecting to create a full-height entrance porch, and the outer bays having canted bay windows to second-floor height. The windows are transommed and mullioned and the parapets are crenellated. To the rear is a plainer three-storey four-bay block and to the right a late 17th-century lower block of three bays.

The Eyres held the manor until 1802 when the estate was sold under an order of Chancery to Robert Birch, who sold it in 1820 to Thomas John Gisborne, second son of  Rev Thomas Gisborne of Yoxall. When Francis Gisborne died in 1881 the estate passed to his brother William Gisborne.

See also
Grade I listed buildings in Derbyshire
Listed buildings in Bakewell

References

Houses completed in 1626
Grade I listed buildings in Derbyshire
Country houses in Derbyshire
1626 establishments in England
Eyre family
Bakewell